Odon  may refer to:

People
 Odo of Gascony (French: Odon) (c. 1010–1039/1040), Duke of Gascony, Duke of Aquitaine and Count of Poitou
 Odon de Bénac, Bishop of Oloron in France from 1083 to 1101
 Odon de Châtillon (died c. 1102), French cardinal
 Odon of Poznań (1149–1194), Duke of Greater Poland and of Kalisz
 Odon or Eudes de Sully (died 1208), Bishop of Paris
 Odon de Pins (1212–1296), Grand Master of the Knights Hospitaller
 Odón Alonso (1925–2011), Spanish conductor and composer
 Odon Bacqué, American politician and non-fiction writer
 Odón Betanzos Palacios (1925–2007), Spanish poet, novelist, literary critic and professor
 Odón de Buen y del Cos (1863–1945), Spanish naturalist, politician and publicist
 Odo Bujwid (1857–1942), Polish bacteriologist sometimes referred to as Odon Budwid
 Odón Elorza (born 1955), Basque politician
 Odon Godart (1913–1996), Belgian astronomer and meteorologist
 Odon Guitar (1825–1908), Union Missouri State Militia brigadier general during the American Civil War
 Odon Jadot (1884–1968) was a Belgian railway engineer and administrator who built more than 1,650 kilometres of railroad in the Belgian Congo
 Odon Razanakolona (born 1946), Archbishop of Antananarivo, Madagascar
 Ödön, a masculine given name of Hungarian origin, including a list of people so named

Places
 Odon (Lydia), a town of ancient Lydia, now in Turkey
 Odon (river), France
 Odón, Aragon, Spain, a municipality
 Odon, Indiana, United States, a town

Other uses
 Separate Operational Purpose Division (ODON), a Russian rapid deployment, internal security division
 Operation Epsom (or the First Battle of the Odon) and the Second Battle of the Odon, both of which took place on the Odon River
 Odón Device, invented by Jorge Odón, which is used to assist in difficult child birth
 "-odon", a suffix used in taxonomy

See also
Odo (disambiguation)

Masculine given names